Petrică Hogiu (born June 16, 1991) is a Romanian cross-country skier who has been competing since 2007. At the 2010 Winter Olympics in Vancouver, he finished 17th in the team sprint and 57th in the 15 km events.

Hogiu's best finish has been second on six occasions in lesser events since 2008.

References
 
 Petrică Hogiu in the sports-reference database

1991 births
Cross-country skiers at the 2010 Winter Olympics
Living people
Olympic cross-country skiers of Romania
Romanian male cross-country skiers